Taipei Exchange, formerly the Gre Tai Securities Market (GTSM), is a foundation which is organized for serving the over-the-counter (OTC) market and bond trading of Taiwan. It was formally founded on 1 November 1994. The initial fund of the foundation was donated by the Taiwan Stock Exchange, Taiwan Securities Association, and Taiwan Depository & Clearing. Its headquarters is in the Zhongzheng District of Taipei City. In February 2015, the Gre Tai Securities Market changed its name to Taipei Exchange.

The exchange has normal trading sessions from 9 am to 2 pm and post-market sessions from 2 pm to 2.30 pm on all days of the week except Saturdays, Sundays and holidays declared by the Exchange in advance.

See also
List of East Asian stock exchanges
List of stock exchanges

References

External links
Official website

Financial services companies established in 1994
 
Finance in Taiwan
Stock exchanges in Asia
Taiwanese companies established in 1994